John W. E. Cluster Jr. (born April 9, 1954) is a former member of the Maryland House of Delegates, representing the 8th district in Baltimore County.

Background
Cluster was appointed as delegate to Baltimore County's District 8 by Governor Bob Ehrlich to replace Republican Alfred W. Redmer Jr., who was named Maryland Insurance Commissioner.

Cluster was appointed on July 11, 2003, and sworn in on July 29, 2003. He was defeated in his bid for election in 2006 by Democrat Todd Schuler. On November 2, 2010, Cluster regained his seat in the Maryland General Assembly, serving until he resigned July 31, 2016.

Education
Cluster graduated from Catonsville High School in southwest Baltimore in 1972.  After high school he attended Essex Community College.

Career
Cluster was a patrolman for the Baltimore County Police Department from 1975 until 1979 when he was promoted to Corporal.  He maintained this rank until 1983 when he was promoted to Sergeant, a position he held until 1989 when he retired.  He later worked for the Department of Juvenile Services as the Director of Capital Planning and Facilities Management.

During his time in the Maryland House of Delegates, he was a Member of the Environmental Matters Committee and several subcommittees including the ethics subcommittee in 2004, the local government & bi-county agencies subcommittee, the motor vehicles & transportation subcommittee, the natural resources & ethics subcommittee from 2005 until 2006, and the natural resources subcommittee from 2006 until 2007.  His caucus membership included the Maryland Legislative Sportsmen's Caucus and the Maryland Veterans Caucus.

Cluster is still active in his community. He has been a member of the Fraternal Order of Police Lodge #4 since 1975. He is a former member of the Board of Directors for the Baltimore County Retired Police Association. Additionally, he has been President of the Parkville Business and Professional Association since 2000 and he was a member of the Loch Raven Recreation Council and the Parkville Recreation Council.

Election results
2014 Race for Maryland House of Delegates – District 08
Voters to choose three:
{| class="wikitable"
|-
!Name
!Votes
!Percent
!Outcome
|-
|-
|Christian Miele, Rep. 
|20,164
|  19.4%
|   Won
|-
|-
|John Cluster, Rep.
|19,938
|  19.2%
|   Won
|-
|-
|Eric M. Bromwell, Dem.
|17,361
|  16.7%
|   Won
|-
|-
|Bill Paulshock, Dem.
|15,899
|  15.3%
|   Lost
|-
|-
|Norma Secoura, Rep.
|15,660
|  15.1%
|   Lost
|-
|-
|Renee Smith, Dem.
|14,704
|  14.2%
|   Lost
|-
|Other Write-Ins
|87
|  0.1%
|   Lost
|-
|}
2010 Race for Maryland House of Delegates – District 08
Voters to choose three:
{| class="wikitable"
|-
!Name
!Votes
!Percent
!Outcome
|-
|-
|Joseph C. Boteler III, Rep.
|21,688
|  19.4%
|   Won
|-
|-
|John Cluster, Rep.
|19,462
|  17.41%
|   Won
|-
|-
|Eric M. Bromwell, Dem.
|19,379
|  17.33%
|   Won
|-
|-
|Ruth Baisden, Dem.
|18,640
|  16.67%
|   Lost
|-
|-
|Norma Secoura, Rep.
|16,458
|  14.72%
|   Lost
|-
|-
|Cal Bowman, Dem.
|16,101
|  14.4%
|   Lost
|-
|Other Write-Ins
|80
|  0.1%
|   Lost
|-
|}

2006 Race for Maryland House of Delegates – District 08
Voters to choose three:
{| class="wikitable"
|-
!Name
!Votes
!Percent
!Outcome
|-
|-
|Eric M. Bromwell, Dem.
|20,116
|  17.9%
|   Won
|-
|-
|Joseph C. Boteler III, Rep.
|19,586
|  17.4%
|   Won
|-
|-
|Todd Schuler, Dem.
|18,356
|  16.3%
|   Won
|-
|-
|Ruth Baisden, Dem.
|18,261
|  16.2%
|   Lost
|-
|-
|Melissa Redmer Mullahey, Rep.
|18,160
|  16.1%
|   Lost
|-
|-
|John Cluster, Rep.
|18,057
|  16.0%
|   Lost
|-
|Other Write-Ins
|74
|  0.1%
|   Lost
|-
|}

References and notes

Republican Party members of the Maryland House of Delegates
People from Catonsville, Maryland
1954 births
Living people
American municipal police officers
People from Baltimore County, Maryland
21st-century American politicians